"The Apple Tree" is a 1916 short story by John Galsworthy that has been adapted several times for other media.

Adaptations
Lady Esther Almanac radio show (CBS) - 12 January 1942 - with Orson Welles
Mercury Summer Theatre radio show - 6 September 1946
A Summer Story (1988) - film

References

External links
"The Apple Tree" in Five Tales by John Galsworthy at Project Gutenberg

1916 short stories
British short stories
Short stories adapted into films